Capacitance hat may refer to:
 Capacitance hat, horizontal wires at the top of a T-antenna
 Capacitance hat, a network of rounded wires at the top of a mast radiator